2002–03 Moldovan Cup was the 12th edition of the Moldovan annual football tournament.

Round of 16
The first legs were played on 4 September 2002. The second legs were played on 16 October 2002.

|}

Quarterfinals
The first legs were played on 30 October 2002. The second legs were played on 13 November 2002.

|}

Semifinals
The first legs were played on 19 March 2003. The second legs were played on 10 April 2003.

|}

Final

References
 Moldova - 2002/03 season (RSSSF)

Moldovan Cup seasons
Moldovan Cup 2002-03
Moldova